Samuel Knowles (born 1 August 1994), known professionally as Karma Kid, is an English record producer and DJ from Matlock, Derbyshire. Since 2012 he has been releasing music under his own alias and as Shy Luv. He is now producing records for various international artists in London.

Discography

Singles

Other appearances

Remixes

References

1994 births
English DJs
English record producers
Living people
People from Matlock, Derbyshire